The mongongo tree, mongongo nut or manketti tree (Schinziophyton rautanenii) is a member of the family Euphorbiaceae and of the monotypic genus Schinziophyton. A large, spreading tree, the mongongo reaches 15–20 metres tall. It is found on wooded hills and among sand dunes, and is associated with the Kalahari sand soil-types. The leaves are a distinctive hand-shape, and the pale yellow wood is similar in characteristics to balsa, being both lightweight and strong. The yellowish flowers occur in slender, loose sprays.

Fruit 
The fruits are known as mongongo fruits, mongongo nuts, manketti nuts or nongongo. The egg-shaped, velvety fruits ripen and fall between March and May each year, and contain a thin exocarp around a thick, hard, pitted shell containing an edible nut.

Distribution 
The mongongo is distributed widely through subtropical southern Africa. There are several distinct belts of distribution, the largest of which reaches from northern Namibia into northern Botswana, south-western Zambia and western Zimbabwe. Another belt is found in eastern Malawi, and yet another in eastern Mozambique.

It is also found in Angola, Tanzania and Zaire.

Taxonomy
The genus of Schinziophyton was circumscribed by John Hutchinson ex. Alan Radcliffe-Smith in Kew Bull. vol.45 (1) on page 157 in 1990.

The genus name of Schinziophyton is in honour of Hans Schinz (1858–1941), who was a Swiss explorer and botanist and was a native of Zürich.

Traditional uses 

Mongongo nuts are a staple diet in some areas, most notably among the San people of northern Botswana and Namibia. Archaeological evidence has shown that they have been consumed by the San communities for centuries.  Their popularity stems in part from their flavor, and in part from the fact that they store well, and remain edible for much of the year.

Dry fruits are first steamed to soften the skins. After peeling, the fruits are then cooked in water until the maroon-colored flesh separates from the hard inner nuts. The pulp is eaten, and the nuts are saved to be roasted later. Alternatively, nuts are collected from elephant dung; the hard nuts survive intact through the digestive process after the elephant has consumed and digested them. Once dry, the outer shell cracks easily, revealing the nut, encased within a soft, inner shell. The nuts are either eaten intact, or pounded as ingredients in other dishes.

The oil from the nuts has also been traditionally used as a body rub in the dry winter months to clean and moisten the skin. The wood, being both strong and light, makes excellent fishing floats, toys, insulating material and drawing boards.

Nutrition 
Per 100 grams shelled nuts:
 24 g protein
 57 g fat:
 44% polyunsaturated fatty acids
 18% monounsaturated fatty acids
 17% saturated fatty acids
 193 mg calcium
 527 mg magnesium
 4 mg zinc
 2.8 mg copper
 565 mg vitamin E (tocopherol)

Economic aspects 
Richard Borshay Lee, writes
A diet based on mongongo nuts is in fact more reliable than one based on cultivated foods, and it is not surprising, therefore, that when a Bushman was asked why he hadn't taken to agriculture he replied:  "Why should we plant, when there are so many mongongo nuts in the world?"

See also 
Post-scarcity economy

References 

Crotonoideae
Desert fruits
Edible nuts and seeds
Drought-tolerant trees
Nut oils
Flora of Southern Africa